Christian "Christ" M. Stauffer (May 25, 1896 – October 15, 1963) was an American Republican member of the Wisconsin State Assembly in the late 1950s and early 1960s.

Early life and career
Stauffer was born in Monticello, Wisconsin, and farmed as a partner with his brother until 1918. He also worked as a blacksmith, welder, and horseshoer. He served in the United States Army during World War I from 1918 to 1919.

Political career
Vice President of the League of Wisconsin Municipalities for three years, Stauffer was active in civic, church, and fraternal organizations. He was Fire Chief from 1928 to 1948; president of school boards from 1930 to 1943; and the Village president from 1935 to 1951. He also served two years each with the selective service board and the county school committee.

Elected to the Wisconsin State Assembly in 1956 and reelected in 1958, 1960 and 1962,Stauffer was Chairman of Assembly Committee on Third Reading; vice-chairman of Commerce and Manufactures Committee, a member of the Agriculture Committee, and served on Interstate Co-operation Committee.

Death
Stauffer served in the Assembly until his death from a stroke in 1963. He was a member of the Reformed German Church of Monticello, Wisconsin. He is buried at Highland Cemetery in Monticello.

References

External links
 
Wisconsin Historical Society

People from Monticello, Green County, Wisconsin
Republican Party members of the Wisconsin State Assembly
Military personnel from Wisconsin
United States Army soldiers
United States Army personnel of World War I
1896 births
1963 deaths
20th-century American politicians